Barnarp Church is a church building at  Barnarp in Jönköping County,
Sweden. It belongs to the Barnarp Parish of the Diocese of Växjö in the Church of Sweden.

The oldest part of the church dates to  the 13th century. It was built in   Romanesque architectural style.
The current floor plan is in the shape of a Greek cross following  the addition of the two transepts in 1686–87.
The interior of the church dates to the late 17th century and the mid-18th century and is decorated in the Baroque  style.
In 1730, the  wooden ceilings are illustrated with biblical scenes by the artist Johann Kinnerus (1705-1759).

References

External links

13th-century churches in Sweden
Churches in Jönköping Municipality
Churches converted from the Roman Catholic Church to the Church of Sweden
Churches in the Diocese of Växjö